Jada Mathyssen-Whyman is an Australian soccer player who plays as a goalkeeper for Sydney FC Women team in the W-League.

Early life
Whyman is of Indigenous Australian heritage, with ancestry from the Wiradjuri and Yorta Yorta peoples. Whyman grew up in Wagga Wagga before moving to Canberra and later Sydney, where she attended Westfields Sports High School. She travelled from Wagga Wagga to both Sydney and Canberra regularly until late 2013 when she moved to the Australian Capital Territory.

Playing career

Club
Whyman's first club in Sydney was Macarthur Rams, joining the club in 2013 whilst still living in Wagga Wagga.

In August 2015, Whyman signed to play for Western Sydney Wanderers in the 2015–16 W-League, and made seven appearances in her debut season. She suffered a torn thigh in a game against Newcastle Jets, causing her to miss much of the season.

International
Whyman was first called up to the Australian under-17 team in 2013 for the 2013 AFC U-16 Women's Championship, aged thirteen.

She made her debut for Australia under-20 in a 2–0 win over Uzbekistan in the group stage of the 2015 AFC U-19 Women's Championship.

She was subsequently selected in a squad for the Senior national team who would be playing two friendlies against France and England in October 2018.

Honours

Individual
National Premier Leagues NSW Goalkeeper of the Year: 2015, 2016, 2018
Westfield W-League - Western Sydney Wanderers FC: Player of the Year 2017/18
Westfield W-League - Western Sydney Wanderers FC: Members' Player of the Year 2017/18, 2018/19

References

External links
 

Living people
Sportspeople from Wagga Wagga
Indigenous Australian soccer players
Wiradjuri people
Western Sydney Wanderers FC (A-League Women) players
A-League Women players
Women's association football goalkeepers
Australian women's soccer players
1999 births
Yorta Yorta people